James Arthur Bransgrove (born 12 May 1995) is a retired professional footballer who plays as a goalkeeper for Enfield F.C.

Bransgrove was signed by Brentford from Waltham Abbey in 2012, and a year later he was signed to Colchester United's Academy. After helping Colchester's under-18s to league and cup success, he progressed into the under-21 development squad while experiencing loans away from Colchester with Bishop's Stortford, Maldon & Tiptree and Wealdstone. He made his professional debut for Colchester in May 2016. He announced his retirement from professional football at the age of 21 in December 2016 to pursue a career in business.

Club career
Born in Harlow, Bransgrove was signed by Brentford from Waltham Abbey at the age of 17. He joined Colchester United's Academy from Brentford in the summer of 2013 and impressed in the under-18 side at Colchester. He received a call-up to the Scotland under-18 side following an unbeaten start to the 2013–14 season. The season ended in glory for the under-18 side as Bransgrove helped them to a league title and cup winning double. He made several important saves in the Youth Alliance Cup final on 29 April 2014 during Colchester's 4–2 win against Bradford City at Valley Parade.

Bransgrove made the step-up to the under-21 development squad in the 2014–15 season, where early on he made a crucial penalty save during Colchester's 3–2 win against his old club Brentford at Florence Park. He also provided an assist for Drey Wright after he latched on to Bransgrove's long goal kick. He was named on the first-team bench for the first time on 9 November 2014 for Colchester's FA Cup first round clash against Gosport Borough, although he was unused during the 6–3 win. He joined Conference South side Bishop's Stortford on 12 March 2015 and impressed on his debut during a 0–0 draw with Sutton United. After making seven league appearances for the club, he was recalled early by Colchester during the midst of a goalkeeper injury crisis. As a result, Bransgrove was again named on the first-team bench for Colchester when they were beaten 6–0 by Chesterfield on 14 April.

Bransgrove signed a new one-year deal with Colchester in the summer of 2015, but was then ruled out for several months following knee surgery. He made a return to action in December 2015 in the Essex Senior Cup as Colchester saw off Canvey Island on penalties. He was named on the bench again for Colchester's 3–2 FA Cup win against Altrincham on 6 December, before he was sent out on loan to Maldon & Tiptree for one month on 22 January 2016. He made six league appearances and one cup appearance for the Jammers. He was then loaned out again on 4 March to Wealdstone for one month, where he made five appearances. He signed a new three-year contract with Colchester on 27 April 2016.

Despite dislocating his finger in training earlier in the week, Bransgrove was handed his professional debut by Colchester caretaker manager Steve Ball on 8 May 2016. Fellow Colchester goalkeeper Dillon Barnes missed his own opportunity to make his professional debut after getting caught in traffic, meaning Bransgrove was selected for the game ahead of the absent Barnes. He conceded two goals as the U's lost their final game of the season 2–1 against Rochdale.

Bransgrove made his first appearance of the 2016–17 season on 4 October in Colchester's 2–1 defeat to Southampton U23 in the EFL Trophy.

In December 2016, Bransgrove announced that he was to retire from professional football in order to pursue a career in business, having undertaken a Business Management degree with the Open University.

In March 2017, Bransgrove signed for Chelmsford City as backup to regular goalkeeper Ross Fitzsimons.

Bransgrove signed for Coggeshall Town for the 2017–18 season, making 35 league appearances as the club won the Eastern Counties League.

In January 2019, Bransgrove left Coggeshall Town and signed for Walthamstow. He scored one goal for Walthamstow, coming on as a substitute to play outfield against Tower Hamlets in the Errington Challenge Cup. He transferred to Bowers & Pitsea in February 2020.

Ahead of the 2020–21 season, Bransgrove joined newly formed Essex and Suffolk Border League club Dunmow Town.

International career
Bransgrove was called up to a Scotland under-18 training camp in November 2013 after helping his Colchester United under-18 side to twelve wins out of twelve during the 2013–14 season. He was called up to the under-21 side for the first time in August 2016 for Scotland's games against Macedonia and Ukraine.

Career statistics

Honours
Colchester United U18
2013–14 Football League Youth Alliance South East winner
2013–14 Football League Youth Alliance Cup winner
Coggeshall Town FC
2017–18 Eastern Counties Football League winner

References

1995 births
Living people
Sportspeople from Harlow
Association football goalkeepers
Waltham Abbey F.C. players
Brentford F.C. players
Colchester United F.C. players
Bishop's Stortford F.C. players
Maldon & Tiptree F.C. players
Wealdstone F.C. players
Chelmsford City F.C. players
Coggeshall Town F.C. players
Walthamstow F.C. players
National League (English football) players
Isthmian League players
English Football League players
English footballers
Bowers & Pitsea F.C. players